Cormac Breathnach (1885 – 29 May 1956) was an Irish politician and primary school teacher.

Early life
He was born in Iveragh, County Kerry in 1885, and was known in his younger years as Charlie Walsh. He was the son of Seán Breathnach, a farmer, and Cáit Breathnach (née Chonchubhair). He was educated at the local national school in Ballinakilla, County Kerry (where he was a monitor), and qualified as a national school teacher from the Marlborough Training College in Dublin.

Teaching
Prior to entering politics, Breathnach was a teacher. A fluent Irish speaker, for a period he was engaged by Conradh na Gaeilge to teach the Irish language and history in a number of national schools. Breathnach was also president of Conradh na Gaeilge from 1926 until 1928. His teaching influenced some of his pupils that later figured prominently in the Irish War of Independence, including Dan Breen, Seán Treacy, Seán Hogan, and Dinny Lacey.

In his autobiography, Breen noted: "He did not confine his history lesson to the official textbook. He gave us the naked facts about the English conquest of Ireland and the manner in which our country was held in bondage. We learned about the Penal Laws, the systematic ruining of Irish trade, and the elimination of our native language. He told us also of the ruthless manner in which Irish rebellions had been crushed. By the time we had passed from his class, we were no longer content to grow up 'happy English children' as envisaged by the Board of Education".

During these years he became an active member of the Irish National Teachers' Organisation and was unanimously elected its president in 1920, and again in 1932. In 1922 he played an important part in preparing the way for the introduction of Irish as a compulsory subject in national schools.

Politics
In 1926 he helped establish the Fianna Fáil party and was a member, and later chairman, of its national executive. He was first elected to Dáil Éireann at the 1932 general election. From 1932 to 1937 he served as a Fianna Fáil Teachta Dála (TD) for the Dublin North constituency. In 1937 he moved to the Dublin North-West constituency and served there until 1954. He did not contest the 1954 general election.

Breathnach served as Lord Mayor of Dublin from 1949 to 1950.

Personal life
He married first Kathleen Ryan, who died young; they had two children, one of whom, Seán Breathnach, became a district judge. He later married Bríd Prendergast, a school principal, and lived most of his life in Clontarf Road, Dublin, until his death on 29 May 1956.

References

 

1885 births
1956 deaths
Fianna Fáil TDs
Members of the 7th Dáil
Members of the 8th Dáil
Members of the 9th Dáil
Members of the 10th Dáil
Members of the 11th Dáil
Members of the 12th Dáil
Members of the 13th Dáil
Members of the 14th Dáil
Lord Mayors of Dublin
Irish schoolteachers
Politicians from County Kerry